Bruno Dreossi (born July 11, 1964) is an Italian sprint canoer who competed from the mid-1980s to the early 1990s. Competing in two Summer Olympics, he won a bronze medal in the K-2 500 m event at Barcelona in 1992.

References

External links
 
 
 

1964 births
Living people
Canoeists at the 1988 Summer Olympics
Canoeists at the 1992 Summer Olympics
Italian male canoeists
Olympic canoeists of Italy
Olympic bronze medalists for Italy
Olympic medalists in canoeing
Canoeists of Fiamme Gialle
Medalists at the 1992 Summer Olympics
20th-century Italian people